Matheus Nachtergaele (born 3 January 1968) is a Brazilian actor, director, and screenwriter.

Career
He has starred in numerous Brazilian films, best known for his appearances in the 1997 film Four Days in September and the 2002 film City of God. He has twice won the Best Actor award in the Grande Prêmio do Cinema Brasileiro, for his roles in Midnight (1998) in 2000 and O Auto da Compadecida (2000) in 2001. He also won the Best Actor award for Mango Yellow at XIII Cine Ceará in 2003.

Personal life 
Nachtergaele is bisexual.

Selected filmography
 Four Days in September (1997)
 Central Station (1998)
 Midnight (1998)
 A Dog's Will (2000)
 City of God (2002)
 Mango Yellow (2002)
 Da Cor do Pecado (2004)
 Nina (2004)
 América (2005)
 Journey to the End of the Night (2006)
 La Virgen Negra (2008)
 Doce do Pai LULA (2012)
 Serra Pelada (2013)
 Don't Call Me Son (2016)
 Zama (2017)

References

External links

 

1968 births
Living people
Male actors from São Paulo
Brazilian people of Belgian descent
Brazilian male film actors
Brazilian male television actors
Brazilian LGBT actors
Bisexual male actors
University of São Paulo alumni
Brazilian bisexual people